Return to Atlantis is a 1988 video game published by Electronic Arts for the Amiga.

Gameplay
Return to Atlantis is a game in which the player character goes on missions to help protect the ocean. The player plays the role of Indiana Cousteau, proclaimed as a hero of the oceans.

Development 
Return to Atlantis was announced for the Commodore Amiga in late 1985. It was one of the first titles announced for the platform. The game was marked by a long development time and delays. The art was produced by Mike Wallace. It arrived two years after being announced.

Reception
Douglas Seacat reviewed the game for Computer Gaming World, and stated that "All in all, Return to Atlantis is a game which offers mixed signals."

Reviews
The Games Machine - May, 1988
ASM (Aktueller Software Markt) - Mar, 1988

References

External links
Review in Info
Review in Amiga World
Review in Amazing Computing
Review in Power Play
Review in Commodore User
Review in The Australian Commodore and Amiga Review
Review in Your Amiga

1988 video games
Action-adventure games
Amiga games
Amiga-only games
Electronic Arts games
Naval video games
Scuba diving video games
Side-scrolling video games
Video games developed in the United States
Video games set in Atlantis
Video games set on fictional islands